The 1982 European Curling Championships were held from 6 to 11 December at the Kirkcaldy Ice Rink arena in Kirkcaldy, Scotland.

The Scottish men's team skipped by Mike Hay won their third European title, and the Swedish women's team skipped by Elisabeth Högström won their fifth European title.

Men's

Teams

Round robin
Group A

Group B

  Teams to playoffs

Ranking games for 5th-14th places

Playoffs

Final standings

Women's

Teams

Round robin
Group A

Group B

  Teams to playoffs
  Teams to tiebreaker

Tiebreaker

Ranking games for 5th-12th places

Playoffs

Final standings

References

European Curling Championships, 1982
European Curling Championships, 1982
European Curling Championships
Curling competitions in Scotland
International sports competitions hosted by Scotland
European Curling Championships

European Curling Championships
20th century in Fife